is a Japanese actress and voice actress from Tokyo, Japan.

Biography
She joined the Institute of Literature in 1997 and became a member of the Institute of Literature in 2002, but left in 2017. In the same year, she became a member of Fukuda & Co.

Her father Masato Sako was also an actor and voice actor.

In addition to appearing on the stage, she is also active as a voice actress for dubbing Western movies. She is the regular dubbing voice actress for Scarlett Johansson, Rachel McAdams, Jill Flint and Noomi Rapace.

Filmography

Television animation
Persona: Trinity Soul (2008), Saki Tachibana / Mayuri Yamasaki
Dragon Crisis! (2011), Kai
Kindaichi Case Files R (2014), Ivy Liu (Only in Hong Kong Kowloon Treasure Murder Case)
In/Spectre (2020), Rikka Sakuragawa
Great Pretender (2020), Isabelle Mueller
Vinland Saga Season 2 (2023), Arnheid

Theatrical animation
Spirited Away (2001)

Video games
Resident Evil 6 (2013, Japanese dub), Helena Harper
The Order: 1886 (2015, Japanese dub), Lady Igraine
Need For Speed (2015, Japanese dub), Robyn
The King of Fighters XIV (2016), Vice
Detroit: Become Human (2018, Japanese dub), Kara
The King of Fighters All Star (2018), Vice
Ghost of Tsushima (2020, Japanese dub), Tomoe
Tactics Ogre: Reborn (2022), Cerya Phoraena

Dubbing

Live-action
Rachel McAdams
Sherlock Holmes, Irene Adler
Morning Glory, Becky Fuller
Sherlock Holmes: A Game of Shadows, Irene Adler
A Most Wanted Man, Annabel Richter
True Detective (season 2), Ani Bezzerides
Southpaw, Maureen Hope
Disobedience, Esti Kuperman
Eurovision Song Contest: The Story of Fire Saga, Sigrit Ericksdóttir
Noomi Rapace
The Girl with the Dragon Tattoo, Lisbeth Salander
The Girl Who Played with Fire, Lisbeth Salander
The Girl Who Kicked the Hornets' Nest, Lisbeth Salander
Prometheus (2017 The Cinema edition), Elizabeth Shaw
Passion, Isabelle James
Child 44, Raisa Demidova
Scarlett Johansson
Iron Man 2, Natalie Rushman / Natasha Romanoff
We Bought a Zoo, Kelly Foster
Don Jon, Barbara Sugarman
Lucy, Lucy
Hail, Caesar!, DeeAnna Moran
Rough Night, Jess Thayer
Jill Flint
The Good Wife, Lana Delaney
Nurse Jackie, Melissa Greenfield
Royal Pains, Jill Casey
Elementary, Alysa Darvin / Elle Basten
The Night Shift, Dr. Jordan Alexander
Jessica Chastain
Lawless, Maggie Beauford
Zero Dark Thirty, Maya
Miss Sloane, Elizabeth Sloane
Molly's Game, Molly Bloom
The 355, Mason Browne
Olga Kurylenko
Quantum of Solace, Camille Montes
Erased, Anna Brandt
Johnny English Strikes Again, Ophelia Bhuletova
15 Minutes of War, Jane Andersen
Emma Stone
Gangster Squad, Grace Faraday
Battle of the Sexes, Billie Jean King
Maniac, Annie Landsberg
Jessica Alba
Awake, Sam Lockwood
Machete, Sartana Rivera
Mechanic: Resurrection, Gina Thornton
Ronda Rousey
The Expendables 3, Luna
Furious 7, Kara
12 Rounds 2: Reloaded, Detective McKenzie (Venus Terzo)
2012, Tamara Jikan (Beatrice Rosen)
The 4400, Isabelle Tyler (Megalyn Echikunwoke)
Æon Flux, Una Flux (Amelia Warner)
And Then There Were None, Vera Claythorne (Maeve Dermody)
Another Life, Cas Isakovic (Elizabeth Ludlow)
The Art of More, Roxanna Whitman (Kate Bosworth)
Attack the Block, Samantha Adams (Jodie Whittaker)
The Beach (2003 NTV edition), Françoise (Virginie Ledoyen)
Burlesque, Nikki (Kristen Bell)
Chapelwaite, Rebecca Morgan (Emily Hampshire)
Chloe, Chloe Sweeney (Amanda Seyfried)
Chronicle, Casey Letter (Ashley Hinshaw)
Cry Macho, Leta (Fernanda Urrejola)
The Darjeeling Limited, Rita (Amara Karan)
Deadpool 2, Domino (Zazie Beetz)
The Death and Life of Bobby Z, Elizabeth (Olivia Wilde)
Death Proof, Jungle Julia Lucai (Sydney Tamiia Poitier)
Eva, Lana (Marta Etura)
Event 15, White (Jennifer Morrison)
The Fast and the Furious: Tokyo Drift, Neela (Nathalie Kelley)
Focus, Jess Barrett (Margot Robbie)
The Following, Emma Hill (Valorie Curry)
Frozen, Parker O'Neill (Emma Bell)
Glass Onion: A Knives Out Mystery, Helen Brand (Janelle Monáe)
The Good Doctor, Jessica Preston (Beau Garrett)
The Hangover Part II, Tracy Billings (Sasha Barrese)
Hannibal, Alana Bloom (Caroline Dhavernas)
Hansel & Gretel: Witch Hunters, Mina (Pihla Viitala)
Hellboy II: The Golden Army, Princess Nuala (Anna Walton)
Home Alone 3 (2019 NTV edition), Alice Ribbons (Rya Kihlstedt)
I Hate Suzie, Suzie Pickles (Billie Piper), Frank (Matthew Jordan-Caws)
I, Tonya, Tonya Harding (Margot Robbie)
The Imitation Game, Joan Clarke (Keira Knightley)
In the Heights, Vanessa (Melissa Barrera)
Inferno, Dr. Sienna Brooks (Felicity Jones)
Infinitely Polar Bear, Maggie Stuart (Zoe Saldana)
In the Blood, Ava (Gina Carano)
The Joneses, Jenn Jones (Amber Heard)
Liar, Laura Nielson (Joanne Froggatt)
The Lost Bladesman, Qilan (Sun Li)
Lucifer, Chloe Decker (Lauren German)
Magnum P.I., Juliet Higgins (Perdita Weeks)
Mary Queen of Scots, Queen Elizabeth I (Margot Robbie)
A Mighty Heart, Asra Nomani (Archie Panjabi)
Motherless Brooklyn, Laura Rose (Gugu Mbatha-Raw)
Mr. & Mrs. Smith (2008 NTV edition), Jasmine (Kerry Washington)
Mrs. America, Gloria Steinem (Rose Byrne)
Mutt Boy, Kim Jung-ae (Uhm Ji-won)
Need for Speed, Julia Bonet (Imogen Poots)
Night at the Museum: Battle of the Smithsonian, Tess / Amelia Earhart (Amy Adams)
The Night House, Claire (Sarah Goldberg)
Nobody's Fool, Danica (Tika Sumpter)
Paranoia, Emma Jennings (Amber Heard)
Penny Dreadful, Brona Croft / Lily Frankenstein (Billie Piper)
The Professor and the Madman, Eliza Merrett (Natalie Dormer)
The Raven, Emily Hamilton (Alice Eve)
Running Wild with Bear Grylls, Danica Patrick
Rush, Nurse Gemma (Natalie Dormer)
S. Darko, Samantha Darko (Daveigh Chase)
Sense8, Sun Bak (Bae Doona)
Sharp Objects, Camille Preaker (Amy Adams/Sophia Lillis)
The Sorcerer's Apprentice, Rebecca Barnes (Teresa Palmer)
The Stand, Nadine Cross (Amber Heard)
Supergirl, Samantha Arias / Reign (Odette Annable)
Thirteen, Evie Zamora (Nikki Reed)
Three Billboards Outside Ebbing, Missouri, Anne Willoughby (Abbie Cornish)
Unknown, Elizabeth Harris (January Jones)
Welcome to Marwen, Deja Thoris (Diane Kruger)
You're Next, Erin (Sharni Vinson)

Animation
DC League of Super-Pets, Lois Lane
Jang Geum's Dream, Choi Geum Yeong
Legend of the Guardians: The Owls of Ga'Hoole, Otulissa
Love, Death & Robots, Greta
Thor: Tales of Asgard (Disney XD edition), Sif

References

External links
Official agency profile 

1978 births
Living people
Japanese stage actresses
Japanese video game actresses
Japanese voice actresses
Voice actresses from Tokyo
20th-century Japanese actresses
21st-century Japanese actresses